Tycoon Talk is a business celebrity talk show broadcast on Hong Kong's TVB Pearl by film producer / host Sean Lee-Davies. He directed and hosted two eight episode series featuring Hong Kong's most recognized billionaires, business leaders, and entrepreneurs. In the series, Lee-Davies gains access to their work environments, as well as, their private lives. In one episode, he challenges American businessman James E. Thompson to a push-up challenge; plays pool with Bruce Rockowitz, co-founder of Pure; and challenges the CEO of Mission Hills Golf Dr. Ken Chu to a round. In addition, he accompanied Tai Sang Bank Director Philip Ma on a helicopter ride around Hong Kong island; and went for a drive with tycoon Sir Gordon Wu in a Nissan Leaf car.

Tycoon Talk was broadcast in 2014 from August 7 to September 25, every Thursday from 21:30 to 10:00 on TVB Pearl. Tycoon Talk Series 2: The Next Generation was broadcast in 2015.

Episodes

References 

 1. http://programme.tvb.com/variety/tycoontalk/
 2. https://www.youtube.com/watch?v=0XUrgRWpyW4
 3. https://www.imdb.com/title/tt3402800/
 4. http://www.missionhillschina.com/en-US/highlights/video-tycoontalk
 5. http://www.sevva.hk/video_Sevva_Tycoon_Talk_with_Bonnae_Gokson.html
 6. http://www.lifestyleasia.com/tag/tycoon-talk/
 7. http://hk.asiatatler.com/society/meet-the-magnate-sean-lee-davies-tycoon-talk-tvb
 8. https://www.crownworldwide.com/en-us/article/crown-s-chairman--jim-thompson--to-appear-on-tycoon-talk
 9.http://programme.tvb.com/variety/tycoontalknthenextgeneration/

External links
Official Programme Website

2014 Hong Kong television series debuts
TVB original programming